Bally Sports New Orleans is an American regional sports network owned by Diamond Sports Group (a joint-venture between Sinclair Broadcast Group and Entertainment Studios), and operated as an affiliate of Bally Sports. The channel broadcasts local coverage of professional and collegiate sports events within New Orleans and the state of Louisiana.

Bally Sports New Orleans is available on cable providers throughout Louisiana, East Texas, South Alabama, the Florida Panhandle, and most parts of southern Mississippi (including Cox Communications, AT&T U-verse, Charter Spectrum, Suddenlink Communications and Comcast), with an estimated regional reach of 2.5 million households with a pay television subscription; it is also available on satellite via DirecTV.

History
The formation of Fox Sports New Orleans was announced on June 25, 2012, after Fox Sports Networks signed a new long-term agreement with the New Orleans Hornets (now the New Orleans Pelicans) to broadcast the NBA team's games. Fox acquired the regional cable television rights to the Hornets after Cox Sports Television declined to renew its contract with the team. The channel launched on October 31, 2012, at the start of the New Orleans Hornets regular season that year; Fox Sports New Orleans broadcast 75 Hornets games during the first year of the team's agreement with the channel.

On December 14, 2017, as part of a merger between both companies, The Walt Disney Company announced plans to acquire all 22 regional Fox Sports networks from 21st Century Fox, including Fox Sports New Orleans. However, on June 27, 2018, the Justice Department ordered their divestment under antitrust grounds, citing Disney's ownership of ESPN. On May 3, 2019, Sinclair Broadcast Group and Entertainment Studios (through their joint venture, Diamond Holdings) bought Fox Sports Networks from The Walt Disney Company for $10.6 billion. The deal closed on August 22, 2019. On November 17, 2020, Sinclair announced an agreement with casino operator Bally's Corporation to serve as a new naming rights partner for the FSN channels. Sinclair announced the new Bally Sports branding for the channels on January 27, 2021.  On March 31, 2021, coinciding with the 2021 Major League Baseball season, Fox Sports New Orleans was rebranded as Bally Sports New Orleans, resulting in 18 other Regional Sports Networks renamed Bally Sports in their respective regions.

On March 14, 2023, Diamond Sports filed for Chapter 11 Bankruptcy.

Programming
In addition to carrying the Pelicans' exhibition, regular season and early-round conference playoff games, Bally Sports New Orleans also airs Major League Baseball games featuring the Texas Rangers and select broadcasts of the NHL's Dallas Stars televised by sister channel Bally Sports Southwest, as well as collegiate sporting events from the Big 12 Conference and Southeastern Conference.

In 2014, Fox Sports New Orleans began airing select Tulane Green Wave college football games, beginning with the September 9 matchup against the Duke Blue Devils. From its foundation, it also reported that the channel would negotiate for the television rights to the New Orleans Saints' team-related programs and events involving the LSU Tigers. While they were successful in acquiring some LSU Tigers sports programming such as Tigers football, basketball, and volleyball, attempts to acquire Saints-related programming were unsuccessful.

On June 16, 2018, FSNO carried a group-stage game in the FIFA World Cup between the Argentina and Iceland teams.  Local Fox affiliate WVUE-DT chose not to carry the game due to a Federal Communications Commission requirement to air E/I programs which it chose not to reschedule.

Notable on-air staff

Current
 Paul Crane – Pelicans host
 Jen Hale – Pelicans sideline reporter
 Joel Meyers – Pelicans play-by-play announcer
 Antonio Daniels – Pelicans color commentator

References

External links
 foxsports.com/southwest – Fox Sports Southwest official website

Fox Sports Networks
Television channels and stations established in 2012
Companies that filed for Chapter 11 bankruptcy in 2023
Television stations in Louisiana
2012 establishments in Louisiana
Bally Sports